The Pitbulls is the debut album by reggaeton duo Alexis & Fido. It was released on November 15, 2005. Featured guests on the album are Mr. Phillips, Héctor el Father, Baby Rasta, Zion & Lennox, Trébol Clan, Tony Sunshine and Baby Ranks. Nesty la Mente Maestra and Víctor el Nasi produced the bulk of the album.

Track listing 
 Bomba de Tiempo (Intro) (feat. Mr. Phillips)	
 Eso Ehh...!! 	
 El Lobo (feat. Héctor el Father & Baby Rasta)
 Gelatina 	
 Sólo un Minuto 	
 Agárrale el Pantalón (feat. Zion & Lennox)	
 Kumbiatón 	
 Perro Caliente 	
 Tú No Sabes 	
 Salgan a Cazarnos (feat. Trébol Clan)
 Tributo Borincano (feat. Tony Sunshine & Mr. Phillips) 
 No Lo Dejes Que Se Apague 	
 ¿Quién Soy? 	
 El Tiburón (feat. Baby Ranks)

Chart performance 
It debuted on 3 Billboard charts: Top Heatseekers (#2), Latin Rhythm Albums (# 2) and Top Latin Albums (# 4). The album was certified Disco de Platino by the RIAA for shipping 100,000 units in the US.

Charts

Certifications

References 

2005 debut albums
Alexis & Fido albums
Albums produced by Luny Tunes
Albums produced by Noriega